Phoebis argante, the apricot sulphur or Argante giant sulphur, is a butterfly in the family Pieridae.

Description
The uppersides of the male's wings are bright orange with a thin black or dark brown border on forewings. The hindwings are slightly paler and have two small whitish spots in the middle. The basic colour of the females vary from white to yellow, with dark borders.

Larvae feed on Pentaclethra macroloba, Cassia biflora, Cassia fruticosa, Inga vera and Inga ruiziana.

Distribution
This species can be found from Mexico up to Peru, in the Antilles and in Cuba.

Subspecies
Specimens from Mexico to Panama do not have a recognised subspecies. The following subspecies are recognised:
P. a. argante (Brazil, Uruguay)
P. a. larra (Fabricius, 1798) (Guyana, Suriname)
P. a. minuscula (Butler, 1869) (Cuba)
P. a. rorata (Butler, 1869) (Dominican Republic)
P. a. comstocki Avinoff, 1944 (Jamaica)
P. a. chincha Lamas, 1976 (Peru)
P. a. martini Comstock, 1944

R. a. argante puddles with other yellows and sulphurs including the stratia sulphur (Aphrissa statira), straight-line sulphur (Rhabdodryas trite) and orange-banded sulphur (Phoebis philea).

References

Funet

External links
Learn about Butterflies
Butterflies and Moths of North America
Butterflies of America

Coliadinae
Butterflies of North America
Butterflies of Central America
Butterflies of the Caribbean
Pieridae of South America
Lepidoptera of Brazil
Fauna of the Amazon
Taxa named by Johan Christian Fabricius
Butterflies described in 1775